Gaétan Gope-Iwate, sometimes spelled Gaéton, (born 5 October 1998) is a New Caledonian footballer who plays as a defender for New Caledonian club AS Wetr and the New Caledonian national team.

Club career
Gope-Iwate started his career in the youth of FC Auteuil-Dumbea. In 2015 he moved to the first team and made his debut. In 2017 he moved to New Caledonian powerhouse AS Wetr.

International career
In 2017 Gope-Iwate was called up by François Tartas for the New Caledonia national football team to play at the 2017 Pacific Mini Games. He made his debut on December 2, 2017, in a 2–1 loss against Vanuatu where he played the whole 90 minutes. So far, Gope-Iwate scored two goals for the national team. He scored those two goals on December 9, 2017 in a 4-2 victory over Tonga.

References

New Caledonian footballers
Association football defenders
New Caledonia international footballers
Living people
1998 births